Kiko is an Indonesian children's television series broadcast on RCTI. This animated series was produced by MNC Animation and has aired since 9 August 2014 (for pre-season) and 7 February 2016 (for season 1). This animated series was adapted from the comic strip Kisah si Kiko from the children's magazine Just for Kids. The second season of Kiko aired on RCTI starting 27 August 2017, and on 30 April 2020 the Kiko Animation Series was also aired on MNCTV.

Synopsis 
Kiko tells of a child of a goldfish who is very independent, even though he is an only child. Kiko who is always cheerful has four good friends, namely Lola the discus fish, Ting Ting the crab, Patino the catfish and Poli the betta fish. On the other hand, the antagonists, Karkus the catfish and Pupus the eel, always make Kiko's life chaotic. One day, the lake where Kiko lives is polluted due to the reckless acts of humans, causing Kiko and friends to turn into mutants.

Characters 
 Kiko (Goldfish)
 Active, very smart, agile, and always a leader among his friends. Kiko is a fast runner, a good soccer player, and an honest and fun friend. His delinquency and curiosity sometimes lead him and his friends to fall into funny and fun adventures. Kiko is Ciko's older cousin.
 Lola (Discus Fish)
 Cooking and caring for a flower garden are this sensitive girl's hobbies. It's true, Lola is easily scared, a crybaby, and anxious. For issues of cleanliness or tidiness, though, she can become an assertive, brave perfectionist! She likes to try new recipes and does not hesitate to ask her friends to taste her cooking, whether it is a success or a failure.
 Ting-Ting (Crab)
 Enjoys experimenting.
 Patino (Iridescent Shark)
 This iridescent shark is Kiko's most powerful and loyal friend. He likes to eat, watch wrestling, and lift weights. He is insensitive and not very smart. He is not aware that he is a flexible and great ballet dancer. He was only afraid of starvation and ran out of Lola's cake.
 Poli (Siamese Fighting / Betta Fish)
 Behind his cold and overly honest nature, Poli is actually a shy child who is not good at expressing his feelings. Sportsmanship and loyalty to friends is the motto of Betta Fish, who likes extreme activities and self-defense. When angry, Poli can only be calmed by a sleep song, which reminds him of a mysterious childhood memory. If he feels sad, Poli will shout: Bete!.
 Karkus (Catfish)
 Catches fish for sale as a hobby.
 Pupus (Yellow Eel)
 Catches fish for sale as a hobby.
 Buba (Crocodile)
 Ciko (Goldfish)
 A poor child who has hobbies like skateboarding, Ciko is the second great-grandson of King Robin Theon Parampaa and cousin of Kiko.
 Patino's father (Iridescent Shark)
 Patino's father has Patino's brown horned hair and has a mustache. Patino calls on his father, "Papa", in the episode "Dimana Patino?".
 Occi (Octopus)
 Kiko's new favorite friend as well as Kiko's pet in the second season of Kiko with the episode Teman Misterius.

Episodes 
In the pre-season (pre-school age version), there are 39 episodes with a duration of 7 minutes. There were 52 episodes in season 1, each of which lasted 11 minutes.

Pre-season

Season one

Season two

Short series 
As of November 2018, the Kiko Animation Series is now 2 minutes long named KIKO Mini Series

Awards and nominations

References

External links 
  
 
 
 

2014 Indonesian television series debuts
2010s animated television series
2010s Indonesian television series
Indonesian children's animated television series
Indonesian children's animated action television series
Indonesian children's animated adventure television series
Indonesian children's animated comedy television series
RCTI original programming
MNCTV original programming